Tahir Shah (né Sayyid Tahir al-Hashimi (Arabic: سيد طاهر الهاشمي); born 16 November 1966) is a British author, journalist and documentary maker of Afghan-Indian descent.

Family
Tahir Shah was born into the saadat of Paghman, an ancient and respected family hailing from Afghanistan. Bestowed with further lands and ancestral titles by the British Raj during the Great Game, a number of Shah's more recent ancestors were born in the principality of Sardhana, in northern India – which they ruled as Nawabs.

His mother, Cynthia Kabraji, was of Zoroastrian Parsi descent and his father was the Indian Sufi teacher and writer Idries Shah. Both his grandfathers were respected literary figures in their own right: Sirdar Ikbal Ali Shah on his father's side, and the Indian poet Fredoon Kabraji, on his mother's side. His elder sister is the documentary filmmaker Saira Shah, and his twin sister is the author Safia Nafisa Shah. Numerous other members of Shah's family have been successful authors, including his aunt Amina Shah, and his Scottish grandmother Elizabeth Louise MacKenzie.

Shah is descended from the Afghan warlord and statesman Jan Fishan Khan. In 1995 Tahir Shah married to the India-born graphic designer, Rachana Shah (née Devidayal), with whom he has two children – Ariane Shah and Timur Shah. The marriage ended in 2017, although the two remain close friends.

Childhood
Shah was born in London and brought up largely in the county of Kent, where his family lived at Langton House, a Georgian mansion in the village of Langton Green near Royal Tunbridge Wells. The property had been owned previously by the family of Lord Robert Baden-Powell, founder of the Boy Scout Movement. Shah has described how, as a child, he played in the woods which are said to have first interested Baden-Powell in the outdoors.

Shah's father, the writer and thinker Idries Shah, surrounded himself with a diverse coterie of people, most of whom were interested in his published work. They included Nobel Laureate Doris Lessing, poet Robert Graves, American novelists J. D. Salinger and Lisa Alther, animator Richard Williams, as well as the pioneer of radar "Coppy" Laws, the garden designer Russell Page, and the actor Walter Gotell. Shah maintains that much of his education derived from spending time with such a varied group of people.

His first appearance on television was in the 1972 BBC documentary about his father, Dream Walkers: One Pair of Eyes, in which Shah, his sisters, and their friends, are seen listening to Idries Shah tell the tale of The Lion Who Saw Himself in the Water.

Shah has described how his Latin tutor appeared at the front door "white as a sheet", at having spotted the renowned classicist Robert Graves digging a ditch at the front of Langton House; and how Doris Lessing encouraged him to read folktales and, later, enthused him to travel.

During his childhood, Shah and his sisters would be taken to Morocco for extended periods, where his grandfather lived until his death in November 1969. Described in his book The Caliph's House, the journeys introduced Shah to "a realm straight out of The Arabian Nights."

Education
Tahir Shah attended Rose Hill Preparatory School in Tunbridge Wells, Kent – where Lord Baden Powell had also been a student. He has described the school as "a throwback to the Victorian age – sadistic and brutal in the extreme." At 13, he was sent to Bryanston School, near Blandford Forum, Dorset. He has written about his inability to keep up, as a result of "profound dyslexia".

Aged 17, Shah learnt to fly in Florida, and graduated with an FAA Private Pilot's Licence. He attended university in San Diego, London and Nairobi – where he studied African dictatorships at the United States International University. He graduated with a Bachelor of Arts in International Relations in 1987.

Shah has detailed how his parents planned to steer him towards the diplomatic service, assuming he would not have the ability to be writer. Accordingly, he was "groomed for the world of diplomacy."

He has described how his father strove to teach his children through stories. These included the escapades of Nasrudin, the wise fool of Sufi folklore, as well as tales of Antar and Abla, and the epic treasury that forms The Thousand and One Nights. During their childhood, Shah and his sisters were encouraged to solve problems for themselves. When they wanted money to buy chocolate, their father showed them how to gather seeds from the garden, and sell them from an old pram in the village.

From an early age, Shah would be given work by his father including "conducting research, as well as editing and writing texts." His first publication, The Middle East Bedside Book was a collaboration between them.

Personal life
Priding himself on being unconventional, Shah rails against society for "churning out cookie cutter people who live cookie cutter lives." He maintains that "the easiest way to have an interesting life is to do the opposite of what everyone else is doing."

Such methodology was the basis for uprooting his wife Rachana, and his two infant children from a small apartment in London's East End, and relocating to a mansion called "Dar Khalifa", said by locals to be haunted by Jinn, "set squarely in the middle of a Casablanca shantytown." The adventure formed the basis for Shah's book The Caliph's House (2006). Shah has written widely about Casablanca, which he has resided in, and Morocco, and is regarded as an expert on both, as well as on India, and a number of other destinations. His life at Dar Khalifa was widely covered in international media.

Writing
Tahir Shah is a prolific author of books, documentaries, book introductions, peer reviewed academic articles, and book reviews. The vast majority of Shah's books can be considered travel literature, with the exception of his 2012 release Timbuctoo. Shah's first published book was Cultural Research, written for the London-based Institute for Cultural Research. One of his more notable works is Trail of Feathers, an account of his trip through Peru, Machu Picchu, the Incas and Cusco. Another book, In Search of King Solomon's Mines, searching for undiscovered mines known only in folklore. Other books like In Arabian Nights and Travels with Myself are mostly about the author's journeys through exotic locations. His first traditional travelogue was in 1995 with Beyond the Devil's Teeth, covering a trip through Africa, India and much of Latin America. 
 
Shah has written book reviews for The Washington Post, The Guardian, and The Spectator. As well as writing and film making, Shah writes screen material and co-wrote Journey to Mecca, an IMAX film charting the first journey made by Ibn Battuta to Mecca for the Hajj, in 1325. In addition, he reviews for a selection of other media on both sides of the Atlantic, and writes pieces for the radio, such as The Journey, which was read on BBC Radio 3.

In the years before he turned his hand primarily to book writing, Shah wrote a large number of serious reportage-type magazine features, highlighting the lives of the voiceless in society, especially those of women. These included pieces about women on Death Row, widows who cleared mines in Cambodia, the trapped lives of bonded labourers in India, and the women-only police stations in Brazil, known as "Delegacia da Mulher" (Woman's Police Station). He continues to write journalistic pieces, especially aimed at drawing attention to causes he believes deserve public attention.

After having published a number of books with traditional publishers, Shah made the move to self publishing in 2011 with his print-on-demand book Travels With Myself, which was published using Lulu.com. He later took his self publishing efforts a step further in 2012 with the release of Timbuctoo and again in 2013 with Scorpion Soup, two limited edition hardcovers that were designed by his wife Rachana.

Influences
Shah regards family friend Doris Lessing as a key influence, as well as his aunt Amina Shah. In addition, Shah maintains a close association with a number of travel writers and novelists, including Robert Twigger, Tarquin Hall, Jason Webster, Rory Maclean, Jason Elliot, and Marcel Theroux. Shah himself has written about his fascination with the works of Bruce Chatwin, especially his book The Songlines, as well as with a range of the classic nineteenth century explorers, such as Samuel White Baker, Heinrich Barth and Sir Richard Burton. He had a close friendship with Wilfred Thesiger, whom he considered a mentor and a source of inspiration.

Shah's father Idries Shah and English poet Robert Graves were close friends and confidants, and for a number of years, Spike Milligan and Robert Graves had a correspondence. The highlights were later published in a book called Dear Robert, Dear Spike. Shortly after Tahir Shah's birth, in a letter dated 6 February 1967, Robert Graves wrote to Spike Milligan:
	"I may be over in a few weeks to help two young Afghan Arabs named Tahir Shah Sayid and his twin sister with a name so beautiful that I forget it. He's the nearest to Mahomet in a straight line, of any Arab baby in existence. Isn't Tahir a splendid name."
				
	
Kabul is locally pronounced to rhyme with 'trouble', not 'a 'bull', and in the book the surname Shah is misspelled as 'Shar'.

Literary style
Shah's style is one of simple prose and overwhelming humour. He has said that his style of using short blocks of text, with a concluding denouement was influenced by Iron & Silk by Mark Salzman, which he first read in 1988; and that he writes with the intention to educate and inform his readers, while at the same time amusing them. In this capacity, one could liken Shah's work to the literary devise employed in several books by his father, Idries Shah, who used the wise fool Mulla Nasreddin to illustrate deeper ideas in human understanding.

Shah avoids "self-congratulatory" literary festivals, although he had appeared as a speaker at a number of them in the past – including at Hay-on-Wye, Wigtown, Shute, Oxford, Deià, Gibraltar, 
and Vilnius. He writes on a rigid schedule, keeping to a daily target. At any one time he has ‘between 25 and 25 writing projects in development’.
Shah's earlier books fell into the travel literature genre, with more recent work being regarded as straight fiction. Most of Shah's work blurs the boundaries between fact and fiction, and Shah himself condemns ‘the way Occidental society draws a rigid line in the sand between one and the other. He champions authors such as Bruce Chatwin and Rory Maclean who have walked a line between the two.

Political involvement

Imprisonment in Pakistan
In July 2005 (a week after the 7 July London bombings) Shah and two colleagues from Caravan Film in London were arrested in Peshawar in Pakistan's Khyber Pakhtunkhwa and held without charge in solitary confinement in a torture prison. Much of the time they were handcuffed, stripped virtually naked, and blindfolded. After sixteen days of interrogations in a "fully equipped torture room," Shah and his colleagues were released. The Pakistani government agreed that they had done nothing wrong. Tahir Shah gave an interview which was screened on British TV's Channel 4 News, and published an article in the British Sunday Times about the ordeal. Shah has publicly maintained his affection for Pakistan, despite the rough treatment he and his film crew received at the hands of the Pakistani secret services. The illegal custody earned Shah and his film crew a mention in the United States Department of State's 2005 report on Pakistan's human rights practices. The news story came back into the spotlight in July 2008, when a British MP claimed that the British government had 'outsourced' the torture of British citizens to Pakistani security agencies.

East-West bridge
Tahir Shah is also a champion of what he calls "the East-West Bridge". In the aftermath of the September 11 attacks in the United States in 2001, Tahir Shah began to devote a great deal of time and energy into establishing and promoting a "cultural bridge" made up by those who, like him, are both from the East and from the West. One example of this work is the Qantara Foundation (from "qantara" meaning "bridge" in Arabic). He has spoken and written on the idea that people such as he have a responsibility to "show the East to the West, and the West to the East," highlighting the common cultural heritage of the two, and working towards a common goal. Shah's greatest interest within the east–west theme is probably the subject of the legacy of science in medieval Islam, and its role in creating a foundation for the Renaissance. He has lectured publicly on the subject and believes strongly in the importance of drawing attention to the polymath poet-scientists from the Golden Age of Islam.

Works

Travels
 Journey Through Namibia, Camerapix, 1994, 
 Spectrum Guide to Jordan, Spectrum Guides, 1994, 
 Beyond the Devil's Teeth, Octagon Press, 1995, 
 Sorcerer's Apprentice, Weidenfeld & Nicolson, 1998, 
 Trail of Feathers, Weidenfeld & Nicolson, 2001, 
 In Search of King Solomon's Mines, John Murray, 2002, 
 House of the Tiger King, John Murray, 2004, 
 The Caliph's House, Doubleday, 2006, 
 In Arabian Nights, Bantam, 2008, 
 Travels With Myself: Collected Work, Mosaique, 2011,

Novels
 Timbuctoo, Secretum Mundi, 2012, 
 Eye Spy, Secretum Mundi, 2013, 
 Casablanca Blues, Secretum Mundi, 2013, 
 Paris Syndrome, Secretum Mundi, 2014, 
 Hannibal Fogg and the Supreme Secret of Man, Secretum Mundi, 2018, 
 Jinn Hunter: Book One — The Prism , Secretum Mundi, 2019, 
 Godman, Secretum Mundi, 2020, 
 Jinn Hunter: Book Two — The Jinnslayer, Secretum Mundi, 2020, 
 Midas, Secretum Mundi, 2021, 
 Jinn Hunter: Book Three — The Perplexity, Secretum Mundi, 2021,

Humour
 Travels With Nasrudin, Secretum Mundi, 2019, 
 The Misadventures of the Mystifying Nasrudin, Secretum Mundi, 2021, 
 The Peregrinations of the Perplexing Nasrudin, Secretum Mundi, 2021, 
 The Voyages and Vicissitudes of Nasrudin, Secretum Mundi, 2021, 
 Nasrudin in the Land of Fools, Secretum Mundi, 2022,

Teaching stories
 Scorpion Soup, Secretum Mundi, 2013, 
 The Man who Found Himself, Secretum Mundi, 2021, 
 The Arabian Nights Adventures, Secretum Mundi, 2021, 
 Caravanserai Stories: Ghoul Brothers, Secretum Mundi, 2021, Limited edition, 
 Caravanserai Stories: Hourglass, Secretum Mundi, 2021, Limited edition, 
 Caravanserai Stories: Imaginist, Secretum Mundi, 2021, Limited edition, 
 Caravanserai Stories: Jinnlore, Secretum Mundi, 2021, Limited edition, 
 Caravanserai Stories: Jinn's Treasure, Secretum Mundi, 2021, Limited edition, 
 Caravanserai Stories: Mellified Man, Secretum Mundi, 2021, Limited edition, 
 Caravanserai Stories: Skeleton Island, Secretum Mundi, 2021, Limited edition, 
 Caravanserai Stories: Wellspring, Secretum Mundi, 2021, Limited edition, 
 The Caravanserai Stories (combined), Secretum Mundi, 2021, Paperback, 
 Daydreams of an Octopus, Secretum Mundi, 2022, 
 When the Sun Forgot to Rise, Secretum Mundi, 2022, 
 Tales Told to a Melon, Secretum Mundi, 2022, 
 Double Six, Secretum Mundi, 2022, 
 The Jinn Files, Secretum Mundi, 2022, 
 A Treasury of Tales, Secretum Mundi, 2022, 
 King of the Jinns, Secretum Mundi, 2022, 
 Mouse House, Secretum Mundi, 2022, 
 On Backgammon Time, Secretum Mundi, 2022, 
 The Cap of Invisibility, Secretum Mundi, 2022, 
 The Destiny Ring, Secretum Mundi, 2022, 
 The Forgotten Game, Secretum Mundi, 2022, 
 The Hoopoe's Flight, Secretum Mundi, 2022, 
 The Paradise Tree, Secretum Mundi, 2022, 
 The Wondrous Seed, Secretum Mundi, 2022,

Anthologies
 The Anthologies: Africa, Secretum Mundi, 2020, 
 The Anthologies: Childhood, Secretum Mundi, 2020, 
 The Anthologies: Ceremony, Secretum Mundi, 2020, 
 The Anthologies: City, Secretum Mundi, 2020, 
 The Anthologies: Danger, Secretum Mundi, 2020, 
 The Anthologies: East, Secretum Mundi, 2020, 
 The Anthologies: Expedition, Secretum Mundi, 2020, 
 The Anthologies: Frontier, Secretum Mundi, 2020, 
 The Anthologies: Hinterland, Secretum Mundi, 2020, 
 The Anthologies: India, Secretum Mundi, 2020, 
 The Anthologies: Jungle, Secretum Mundi, 2020, 
 The Anthologies: Morocco, Secretum Mundi, 2020, 
 The Anthologies: People, Secretum Mundi, 2020, 
 The Anthologies: Quest, Secretum Mundi, 2020, 
 The Anthologies: South, Secretum Mundi, 2020, 
 The Anthologies: Taboo, Secretum Mundi, 2020, 
 The Clockmaker's Box, Secretum Mundi, 2020, 
 Congress With a Crocodile (editor), Secretum Mundi, 2021, 
 A Son of a Son, Volume I (editor), Secretum Mundi, 2021, 
 A Son of a Son, Volume II (editor), Secretum Mundi, 2021, 
 Tahir Shah Fiction Reader, Secretum Mundi, 2021, 
 Tahir Shah Travel Reader, Secretum Mundi, 2021, 
 The Anthologies: Jinns, Secretum Mundi, 2022,  
 The Anthologies: Magic, Secretum Mundi, 2022, 
 The Anthologies: Teaching Stories, Secretum Mundi, 2022, 
 The Anthologies: Nasrudin, Secretum Mundi, 2022,

Screenplays
 Timbuctoo: Screenplay, Secretum Mundi, 2020, 
 Casablanca Blues: The Screenplay, Secretum Mundi, 2020,

On writing
 The Reason to Write, Secretum Mundi, 2020,

Journalism
 Travels With Myself: Collected Work, Mosaique, 2011,

Research
 The Middle East Bedside Book, Octagon Press, 1991, 
 Cultural Research, (editor) for the London-based Institute for Cultural Research, 1993, 
 Three Essays, Secretum Mundi, 2013,

See also
 The Scheherazade Foundation

References

External links

 

                   

1966 births
Living people
English humorists
English travel writers
English documentary filmmakers
English male journalists
People educated at Bryanston School
Tahir Shah
Moroccan storytellers
English people of Afghan descent
English people of Indian descent
English people of Parsi descent
English people of Scottish descent
Journalists from London
British twins
British Asian writers
21st-century British novelists
English explorers
English expatriates in Morocco
People associated with The Institute for Cultural Research
People from Langton Green